Port Blair Port is a seaport in South Andaman district of Andaman and Nicobar in India, near the city of Port Blair. Located on the Andaman Sea, it is one of major ports in India. The port operated by Port Blair Port Trust. All major provisions of the Major Port Trusts Act, 1963, have become applicable to the major port of Port Blair from June 1, 2010. With this, the Port Blair becomes the 13th major port in India and only major port in Andaman and Nicobar.

The Port Blair port would have territorial jurisdiction over 23 other ports in Andaman and Nicobar, including East Island Port, Mayabunder Port, Elphinston Harbour Rangat Port, Havelock Port, Neil Island Port, Chowra Port, Teressa Port and Nancowry Harbour Port.

Infrastructure facilities
The harbor of this port is natural. The Anchorage depth of the port is 12.5m-13.7m and Oil terminal depth of the port is 7.1m - 9.1m. 500 meter long ship can Anchoraged in the port.

References

Ports and harbours of Andaman and Nicobar Islands